

This is a list of the National Register of Historic Places listings in Haywood County, Tennessee.

This is intended to be a complete list of the properties and districts on the National Register of Historic Places in Haywood County, Tennessee, United States.  Latitude and longitude coordinates are provided for many National Register properties and districts; these locations may be seen together in a map.

There are 14 properties and districts listed on the National Register in the county.  One property was once listed, but has since been removed.

Current listings

|}

Former listings

|}

See also

 List of National Historic Landmarks in Tennessee
 National Register of Historic Places listings in Tennessee

References

Haywood
 
Buildings and structures in Haywood County, Tennessee